Mid Anglia  may refer to:

 The central part of the East of England region
 Mid-Anglia Radio, former radio broadcaster
 Mid-Anglia Constabulary, now Cambridgeshire Constabulary

See also
 Anglia (disambiguation)
 East Anglia
 West Anglia (disambiguation)
 Middle Angles